Roderick J. McDavis, Ph.D., (born October 17, 1948) is the former 20th president of Ohio University, located in Athens, Ohio. McDavis has more than 35 years of service in higher education, including roles as both a professor and an academic administrator.

Academic career 

Dr. Roderick McDavis began his academic career as an undergraduate at Ohio University and earning a B.A.  He was a runner on the men's varsity track team.  He later completed an M.A. degree at the University of Dayton and a Ph.D. degree at the University of Toledo, both in the field of higher education.  He was a professor of education in the Department of Counselor Education at the University of Florida from 1974–1989 and an associate dean of the graduate school and minority programs at the same university from 1984–1989.
He served as dean of the College of Education and professor of counselor education at the University of Arkansas, Fayetteville, from 1989–1994 and as director of the Arkansas Academy for Leadership Training and School-Based Management from 1992–1994. He was dean of the College of Education and professor of education at the University of Florida from 1994–1999.
 
McDavis subsequently served as provost and vice president for academic affairs and professor of education at Virginia Commonwealth University in Richmond, Va., from 1999–2004.

McDavis became the 20th president of the Ohio University on July 1, 2004. He is the first Ohioan of African ancestry and only the second alumnus to lead Ohio University as president. He is a member of Omega Psi Phi fraternity.

On March 10, 2016, McDavis announced his retirement, effective June 30, 2017. The university subsequently announced, on December 9, 2016, he would be stepping down earlier, on February 17, 2017, to accept a position as managing principal and chief executive officer of AGB Search.

Professional Achievements 

In 1995, McDavis was named Person of the Year in Education by The Gainesville Sun. He also received the Post-Secondary Outstanding Educator Award from the North Central Florida Chapter of Phi Delta Kappa in 1996. McDavis was the recipient of the 1997 Black Achiever's Award in Education from the Florida Conference of Black State Legislators. In 2007, McDavis was one of only six president and CEO-level leaders in the state to be recognized with a Leadership Ohio Award of Excellence.

Upon becoming president of Ohio University in 2004, one of the first major initiatives he led was the development of a strategic planning process. That process led to the creation and implementation of Vision OHIO, the university's first comprehensive strategic plan.

McDavis and his wife, Deborah, helped launch two key Ohio University scholarship initiatives — the Urban Scholars and Appalachian Scholars programs. The two programs were created to support one of McDavis's primary goals, which is to increase the diversity of the student population and enhance opportunities for high-achieving students who may not otherwise have an opportunity to get a college education. The Urban Scholars Program was established in 2004 and the Appalachian Scholars Program was established in 2005. These programs provide academically gifted students from disproportionately represented backgrounds with full-tuition scholarships as well as support for textbooks and professional development opportunities. The Urban Scholars Program focuses on students from major metropolitan areas, while the Appalachian Scholars Program selects students from 29 Appalachian counties in Ohio.

McDavis was instrumental in the creation and growth of the LINKS Scholarship Program, which was aimed at diversifying the student body of the university by providing assistance to non-white students, regardless of whether or not they met basic admission standards for acceptance and enrollment as students. When confronted by the student council with reports that qualified applicants had been passed over for sub-standard students based solely on race, McDavis made no apologies, and was subsequently barred from attending student council proceedings. His house and car were repeatedly vandalized by offended students, who were met with legal penalties while he continued the biased practices included in the program.

On October 28, 2008, McDavis created another important initiative to support increasing diversity. The Interlink Alliance, an educational partnership, was formed with nine member institutions, including Ohio University and eight historically black colleges and universities. In addition to Ohio University, members of the Interlink Alliance include Spelman College in Atlanta; Hampton University in Hampton, Va.; Wilberforce University and Central State University in Wilberforce, Ohio; Johnson C. Smith University in Charlotte, N.C.; North Carolina Central University in Durham, N.C.; South Carolina State University in Orangeburg, S.C.; and Virginia State University in Petersburg, Va.

As of March 2009, the McDavises had contributed $82,400 in support of Ohio University programs and initiatives. 

McDavis also has sought to focus efforts on enhancing the university's reputation as an institution of academic excellence. The success of Ohio University's Office of Nationally Competitive Awards speaks to the impact of those efforts, with a university record set in the 2007–08 academic year. In addition, Ohio University's forensics team ranked seventh in the 2009 National Forensics Association National Tournament  and the Ohio University College of Business earned a spot on BusinessWeek's 2009 list of the top 50 undergraduate business programs in the nation. The university's scholar-athletes have excelled academically, with the volleyball and softball teams recognized by the NCAA as being in the top 10 percent in their respective sports' Academic Progress Rate.

McDavis has increased environmental integrity for the institution with executive sustainability initiatives. In 2007, he became the first four-year public university president in Ohio to sign the American College & University Presidents Climate Commitment, a campaign to reduce global warming through research, education, and institutional commitments to climate neutrality. McDavis appointed a Presidential Advisory Council for Sustainability Planning, composed of Ohio University faculty, staff, and students, to develop recommendations for a comprehensive sustainability plan and university-wide climate action plan. McDavis also attended the Climate Leadership Summit in Chicago in August 2009 featuring leaders such as keynote speaker and former U.S. President Bill Clinton.

In 2009, McDavis was elected to a third consecutive term as chair of the presidents of Ohio's Inter-University Council (IUC), an association of the 14 public universities in Ohio. As IUC chairman, McDavis was instrumental in developing and recommending a new funding formula for Ohio's public colleges and universities.  McDavis was a polished leader of the University, and often sought after by the press, where he highlighted student experiences:

As of fall 2008, enrollment across all Ohio University campuses and programs during McDavis's tenure had increased by 1,200 students to 29,713, the highest total in the university's history. Preliminary enrollment numbers for fall 2009 show an additional increase of approximately 2,000 students, setting another record for the institution.  McDavis is well known for his public service throughout the U.S., especially in the East.

In early 2009, after the success of The State vs. Radric Davis, Gucci Mane visited Ohio University to meet President Roderick McDavis because they share similar names.

Controversy 

McDavis had a difficult relationship with faculty, and conflicts with students, especially with respect to arrests made in connection with student protests connected with President Trump's travel ban. The inspector general of Ohio appears to have an open investigation of conflict of interest involving a local landlord and donor and the university concerning a house McDavis and his wife moved to in 2015. A balanced review of McDavis' tenure was published in a series of several articles in the award-winning student paper The Post. In spite of Dr. McDavis's claims of accomplishments, Ohio University suffered a steady and significant drop in national rankings throughout his tenure. https://www.athensnews.com/news/campus/ou-s-drop-in-rankings-stirs-concern-among-trustees-faculty/article_4490ceb4-a44d-11e6-bbfd-8b8775460378.html

Personal life 

One of three sons, along with his brother Frederick, McDavis was one of Joseph and Mabel McDavis' twin boys, and grew up in Dayton, Ohio.  Dr. McDavis is married to his wife Deborah and they have two adult sons, including Ryan who specializes in Title IX.  The McDavises are Lutheran.

External links

References 

Writers from Pittsburgh
Writers from Dayton, Ohio
Presidents of Ohio University
University of Florida faculty
Ohio University alumni
Living people
1948 births